Kentucky Route 2052 (KY 2052) is a north–south state highway extending  across southern Louisville, Kentucky. The southern terminus of the route is at KY 1065 (Outer Loop). The northern terminus is at U.S. Route 31E/U.S. Route 150 at the Beuchel Bypass.

KY 2052 is named Shepherdsville Road for almost the entirety of its route, turning right onto Hikes Lane for its last .

Route description
KY 2052 begins at an intersection with KY 1065 in Louisville, heading north on Sheperdsville Road, a five-lane road with a center left-turn lane. The road passes through residential neighborhoods before crossing a CSX railroad line. At this point, the route heads past a mix of homes and commercial establishments, coming to an intersection with KY 1747. KY 2052 passes a few businesses before intersecting KY 864 and continuing north into industrial areas, where it passes to the west of General Electric Appliance Park. The route becomes a four-lane divided highway as it comes to an intersection with the southern terminus of KY 1703. Following this intersection, KY 2052 gains a center left-turn lane again as it continues past more industry before running between residential neighborhoods to the west and industrial establishments to the east. The road passes over a Norfolk Southern railroad line and runs between industry to the west and homes to the east. The route curves to the northwest before it turns northeast to follow Hikes Lane. KY 2052 comes to its northern terminus at an intersection with US 31E/US 150 in a commercial area.

Major intersections

See also
Roads in Louisville, Kentucky

References

2052
2052
Transportation in Jefferson County, Kentucky